Lucian Walton "Father" Parrish (January 10, 1878 – March 27, 1922) was a U.S. Representative from Texas.

Born in Sister Grove, near Van Alstyne, Texas, Parrish moved with his parents to Clay County in 1887 and settled near Joy, Texas. He attended the public schools of Joy and Bowie, Texas, and the North Texas State Normal College at Denton, Texas (now the University of North Texas). He taught school for two years. Parrish was a guard at Texas, playing from 1903 to 1906. He graduated from the law department of the University of Texas at Austin in 1909. He was admitted to the bar the same year and commenced practice in Henrietta, Texas.

One account reads: "Lucian W. Parrish's name has been inseparably connected with university athletics for the past five years, and it will be a long time before his name will be forgotten on the field and track. Assistant Coach Parrish has worked up several new tricks and plays during the summer, which will add materially to the play of Texas. In choosing the all-southern team the football critics have with few exceptions overlooked every team but Vanderbilt, but the one exception is "Parrish of Texas," who has been at left guard for three years." He was chosen for an all-time Texas team by R. W. Franklin.

Death
Parrish was elected as a Democrat to the Sixty-sixth and Sixty-seventh Congresses and served from March 4, 1919, and was campaigning for the nomination for U.S. Senator for Texas when he was seriously injured in an automobile accident on March 15, 1922. Parrish was driving in Fisher County while driving from Anson to Roby when his car plunged off a bridge over the Cottonwood Creek, and injured his skull and broke his jaw.  He was taken to a hospital in Stamford.  His condition got worse and he was transferred to a hospital in Wichita Falls.  Twelve days after he was hurt, he died,, at the age of 44, of cerebral meningitis that had developed during his convalescence.  He was interred in Hope Cemetery in Henrietta.

See also
List of United States Congress members who died in office (1900–49)

References

Sources

Parrish, Lucius Walton

1878 births
1922 deaths
University of North Texas alumni
University of Texas School of Law alumni
Democratic Party members of the United States House of Representatives from Texas
All-Southern college football players
American football guards
Texas Longhorns football players
People from Henrietta, Texas